The Infinite Quest is an animated serial based on the British science fiction television series Doctor Who. It was made by BBC Television, but does not share the same producers as the live-action series. It was aired in twelve weekly parts (three and a half minutes each) starting 2 April 2007 as a segment of the children's spin-off show Totally Doctor Who. The final instalment (after episode 12) was shown at the end of the "Omnibus" episode, thus increasing the total to thirteen parts, making the compiled series the equivalent length of a standard episode of Doctor Who. The compiled story was broadcast on 30 June 2007, coinciding with the finale of Series 3.

Plot
An alien named Baltazar has set his sights on Earth, planning to compress its population into diamonds. The Tenth Doctor and Martha Jones arrive on his ship to stop him. The Doctor frees Baltazar's bird, Caw, who carries Baltazar away. The Doctor muses that Baltazar will end up on the ice prison planet Volag-Noc at some point.

Caw takes the Doctor and Martha to his home planet Pheros, where he spits up a datachip, explaining that it and three others like it hold the location of The Infinite, an ancient spaceship that can grant people their heart's desire. Each datachip leads to the next one. As the two set off on their quest, Caw is revealed to be working for Baltazar.

The Doctor and Martha find the three datachips, each one on a different planet - one on Boukon, one on Myarr, and one on Volag-Noc. Once they gather all three chips, Baltazar tracks them down with Caw's son Squawk, who Caw had hidden in a gift to Martha on Pheros. Baltazar then takes the two hostage, forcing the Doctor to show the way to The Infinite. Caw is fatally injured trying to protect Martha. Once the Doctor locks in The Infinite'''s location, Baltazar takes control of the TARDIS, knocks The Doctor out with a blast, and leaves him to perish in the snow.

On The Infinite, Baltazar orders Martha to find the hold, which she does by accidentally falling through the deck. In the hold, Martha finds the Doctor waiting for her. She soon realises this isn't the real Doctor, but a manifestation of her wishing he was there. The real Doctor arrives soon after, having used Squawk to follow their time trail to reach them. He explains that the desires granted by The Infinite are little more than illusions, the last spark of whatever powerful being died within its walls. Once Martha realises this, the Infinite's manifestation of the Doctor disappears. Baltazar, however, has not yet realised this; he is standing in a treasure room, oblivious to Martha's warnings about the illusion. The Doctor uses his sonic screwdriver to vibrate the wreckage, causing the ship to fall apart. He and Martha flee in the TARDIS, and Squawk sends Baltazar to Volag-Noc for his crimes.

Production
One segment of The Infinite Quest was shown each week during Totally Doctor Who from 2 April to 29 June 2007. The serial, animated by Firestep, was the second officially licensed, animated Doctor Who serial, the first being the flash-animated Scream of the Shalka (2003). Missing episodes of the 1968 serial The Invasion were also animated for that serial's 2006 DVD release. Both of these animations were produced by Cosgrove Hall. The BBC describes Firestep as "the creative team behind previous Doctor Who animated adventures for the BBC." The Firestep website attributes the name to former Cosgrove Hall animators Jon Doyle and Steve Maher.

An earlier animated series based on Doctor Who, to be produced by Nelvana for CBS, was planned in the 1980s, but fell through. Production art had been drawn up by Ted Bastien. Three limited animated webcasts – Death Comes to Time, Real Time, and Shada – were made and "cast" on the BBC Website before Scream of the Shalka.

A second animated serial, Dreamland'', was produced and aired and released in six part on BBC Red Button from 23 November 2009, and was broadcast in full on BBC Two on 5 December 2009.

References

External links

Tenth Doctor episodes
2007 British television episodes